The Are language is an Austronesian language of the eastern Papua New Guinean mainland.

References

Nuclear Papuan Tip languages
Languages of Milne Bay Province